Amenhotep (Ỉmn-ḥtp; "Amun is pleased" or "Amun is satisfied") is an ancient Egyptian name. Its Greek version is Amenophis. Its notable bearers were:


Pharaohs of the 18th dynasty
Amenhotep I
Amenhotep II
Amenhotep III
Amenhotep IV (Akhenaten)

Princes
 Amenhotep A, a son of Sobekhotep IV (13th dynasty), named on a box (now in Cairo)
 Amenhotep D, a son of Amenhotep II (18th dynasty)
 Amenhotep F, princely name of Akhenaten
 Amenhotep G, a son of Ramesses II (19th dynasty), 14th on the list of princes

Nobles
 Amenhotep (treasurer) treasurer of the 13th Dynasty
 Amenhotep (high steward), high steward of Hatshepsut (18th Dynasty)
 Amenhotep son of Hapu, deified Ancient Egyptian architect (18th Dynasty)
 Amenhotep, Priest of Amun (18th Dynasty)
 Amenhotep-Huy, Vizier of South under Amenhotep III (18th Dynasty)
 Amenhotep (Huy), the high steward of Memphis under Amenhotep III (18th Dynasty)
 Amenhotep called Huy, Viceroy of Kush under Tutankhamon (18th Dynasty)
 Amenhotep, son of Yuti, chamberlain under Amenhotep III (18th Dynasty)
 Amenhotep (Asyut), official and physician (19th Dynasty)
 Amenhotep, Priest of Amun, High Priest from the 20th Dynasty
 Amenhotep, father of Queen Kakat (23rd Dynasty)

Other
The father of Rapses in Mummies Alive! is named Amenhotep (although which one is not specified)
4847 Amenhotep (the name of an asteroid)
Ptolemaic era owner of a Book of the Dead from the  Joseph Smith Papyri collection
Imhotep, a similar name

Ancient Egyptian given names
Theophoric names